Šmohor is a settlement in the Municipality of Laško in eastern Slovenia. It lies in the hills northwest of Laško. The area is part of the traditional region of Styria. It is now included with the rest of the municipality in the Savinja Statistical Region.

The local church, from which the settlement gets its name, is dedicated to Saint Hermagoras and belongs to the Parish of Laško. It was first mentioned in written documents dating to 1421.

References

External links

Šmohor on Geopedia

Populated places in the Municipality of Laško